Leona Winter (previously known as Miss Leona) is the stage name of Rémy Solé, a French drag queen, best known for winning the second season of the Chilean reality show The Switch Drag Race, the Chilean version of RuPaul's Drag Race.

Early life 
Solé was born in Ceret, south of France, and comes from Spanish heritage. He started taking dance classes when he was eight, and singing classes when he was nine at Arles-sur-Tech where his family is from. He started to take theater classes when he was twelve, and started doing drag at seventeen. He resided in Barcelona before participating in The Switch.

Career 
In 2017, Leona Winter was the winner of the Miss Continental prelim pageant Miss Europe Continental in 2017. She was the winner of the Miss Latina Continental prelim in 2018.

Leona Winter appeared as one of fifteen contestants for the second season of The Switch in March 2018. She was announced the winner of the season on July 16, 2018, after beating Pavel Arámbula, Sofía Camará and Gia Gunn.

Winter participated in the eighth season of the French version of The Voice on March 2, 2019, and joined the team of singer Jenifer and went as far as the semi-finals.

On February 3, 2020, Leona Winter appeared as Rémy Solé in the cast of the twelfth season of Les Anges which took place in Hong Kong.

Queen of the Universe 

In November 2021, they were announced as one of fourteen contestants on the debut season of Queen of the Universe, an international drag queen singing competition, and a spin-off of RuPaul's Drag Race.

Personal life 
Solé is married to Lorenzo Werner.

Filmography

Television

References 

1995 births
Living people
21st-century French male singers
Spanish drag queens
The Switch Drag Race
French drag queens
Queen of the Universe contestants
Drag Race (franchise) winners